The 1970 Women's Open Squash Championships was held at the BP Club in Sydenham, London from 13–18 February 1970.Heather McKay (née Blundell) won her ninth consecutive title defeating Marcia Roche in the final.

Seeds

Draw and results

First round

Second round

Third round

Quarter-finals

Semi-finals

Final

References

Women's British Open Squash Championships
British Open Squash Championships
Women's British Open Squash Championships
Squash competitions in London
Sydenham, London
Women's British Open Squash Championships
British Open Championships
Women's British Open Squash Championships